James Mulroy (1 August 1940 – 12 February 2013) was an Irish Gaelic footballer, manager and politician. He played as a right wing-forward for the Louth senior team.

Mulroy made his first appearance for the team during the 1959 championship and was a regular member of the starting fifteen until his retirement after the 1971 championship. During that time he found little success on the inter-county scene.

At club level Mulroy had a lengthy career with Newtown Blues winning nine county club championship medals.

In retirement from playing Mulroy became involved in coaching and team management. He found little success during his two stints as Louth manager, however, he successfully managed Oliver Plunkett's to junior and intermediate championships. Mulroy also coached various teams with his own Newtown Blues club.

Also well known in political circles, Mulroy was first elected to the Drogheda Corporation and Louth County Council in 1985 as a Fianna Fáil candidate and he was a member of Seanad Éireann from 1987 to 1989 as a Taoiseach's nominee. He was an unsuccessful candidate for Dáil Éireann in the Louth constituency at the 1987 and 1989 general elections.

References

1940 births
2013 deaths
Fianna Fáil senators
Irish businesspeople
Irish sportsperson-politicians
Local councillors in County Louth
Members of the 18th Seanad
Leinster inter-provincial Gaelic footballers
Louth inter-county Gaelic footballers
Newtown Blues Gaelic footballers
People from Drogheda
Nominated members of Seanad Éireann